"Another One Bites the Dust" is a song by the British rock band Queen. Written by bassist John Deacon, the song was featured on the group's eighth studio album The Game (1980). It was a worldwide hit, charting number one on the US Billboard Hot 100 for three weeks, from 4 October to 18 October (being their second and final number-one single in the country). The song spent 15 weeks in the Billboard top 10 (the longest running top ten song of 1980), including 13 weeks in the top five, and 31 weeks total on the chart (more than any other song in 1980). It reached number two on the Hot Soul Singles chart and the Disco Top 100 chart, and number seven on the UK Singles Chart. The song is credited as Queen's best-selling single, with sales of over 7 million copies. This version was ranked at number 34 on Billboard's All-Time Top Songs.

The song won an American Music Award for Favorite Rock Single and also garnered a Grammy Award nomination for Best Rock Performance by a Duo or Group with Vocal. "Another One Bites the Dust" has been covered, remixed and sampled by many artists since its release, and has also appeared in TV shows, commercials, films and other media. The song has also featured at sports events.

History
John Deacon's bass line was inspired by "Good Times" by the disco group Chic. In an interview with NME, Chic co-founder Bernard Edwards stated, "That Queen record came about because that Queen bass player... spent some time hanging out with us at our studio."

Recording sessions – produced by Reinhold Mack at Musicland Studios in Munich (West Germany) – consisted of Deacon playing almost all instruments: bass guitar, piano, electric guitar, and handclaps. Roger Taylor added a drum loop and Brian May contributed noises with his guitar and an Eventide Harmonizer. There are no synthesisers in the song: all effects are created by piano, electric guitars and drums, with subsequent tape playback performed in reverse at various speeds. Finally, sound effects were run through the harmonizer for further processing. The effect of the harmonizer can be heard clearly in the "swirling" nature of the sound immediately before the first lyric. In early live performances, Taylor sang lead on the chorus, as opposed to the studio version sung entirely by Mercury. As the song became more well-known, the band could rely on audiences to sing the chorus by themselves. After attending a Queen concert in Los Angeles, Michael Jackson suggested to Freddie Mercury backstage that "Another One Bites the Dust" be released as a single.

At the 1981 American Music Awards on 30 January, "Another One Bites the Dust" won the award for Favorite Pop/Rock Single. The song also garnered Queen a Grammy nomination for Best Rock Performance by a Duo or Group with Vocal. It lost to Bob Seger's Against the Wind. The music video for "Another One Bites the Dust" was filmed at Reunion Arena in Dallas, Texas on August 9th, 1980. The song also appears in Queen's  Greatest Hits album in 1981.

To "bite the dust" means to die or to lose in a contest or game.  The beginning lyrics set up a scene similar to a mobster movie, with "machine guns ready to go". Later lyrics refer to a failed relationship as "another one bites the dust". The singer is not going to let it get him down, "standing on my own two feet". The song was used in a preliminary cut of Rocky III, before being replaced by Survivor's "Eye of the Tiger". "When one of my idols, Brian May, attended one of our shows in Los Angeles in 1984, he brought up that subject", recalled Survivor guitarist Frankie Sullivan, to whom Sylvester Stallone had supplied a copy of the movie. "I offered to send him a copy of the tape, which I still own."

Critical reception
Billboard called it a "snarling track" with a "spare, lean sound."  Record World said that "a brutal bass conspires with the sing-along hook on this thoroughly contagious [song]."  Classic Rock History critic Millie Zeiler rated it John Deacon's 2nd best Queen song.

Alleged backward masking

In the early 80s, "Another One Bites the Dust" was one of many popular rock songs that Christian evangelists alleged contained subliminal messages through a technique called backmasking. It was claimed that the chorus, when played in reverse, can be heard as "Decide to smoke marijuana", "It's fun to smoke marijuana", or "Start to smoke marijuana". A spokeswoman for Hollywood Records (Queen's current US label) has denied that the song contains such a message.

Queen comments on the song

Use in medical training
"Another One Bites the Dust" was used in a study to train medical professionals to provide the correct number of chest compressions per minute while performing CPR. The bassline has close to 110 beats per minute, and 100–120 chest compressions per minute are recommended by the British Heart Foundation, and endorsed by the Resuscitation Council (UK).

Personnel 

 Freddie Mercury – lead and backing vocals
 Brian May – electric guitar
 Roger Taylor – drums
 John Deacon – bass and electric guitar, piano, percussion

Charts and certifications

Weekly charts

Original release

Reissues

Year-end charts

Certifications and sales

All-time charts

Hollywood Records remixes
The first official remix of "Another One Bites The Dust" was Phase 5's Long Dusted B-Boy Version, which was released on the Hollywood BASIC compilation BASIC Beats Sampler in early 1992. The remix featured a new rap verse by Money-B of Raw Fusion and contained many samples from other records including, but not limited to, "Flash" by Queen themselves, "The Breaks" by Kurtis Blow, "I Know You Got Soul" by Eric B. & Rakim, "Good Times" by Chic, "Hyperbolicsyllabicsesquedalymistic" by Isaac Hayes and "It's Too Funky in Here" by James Brown. Dave Ogilvie edited the Phase 5 remix for inclusion on the April 1992 compilation BASIC Queen Bootlegs removing profanity from the rap verse and problematic samples due to copyright clearance. A separate remix by Onyx producer ChySkillz was due to appear featuring rap verses by Ice Cube, Hi-C and Manson. Ogilvie also recorded his own remix in sessions for the album, but did this not feature on the final track listing. All four versions have since leaked.

Wyclef Jean remix

In 1998, American rapper Wyclef Jean covered and remixed the song for the film Small Soldiers. His version also features rap verses from Pras Michel and Free. The track also appears on Queen's compilation Greatest Hits III, released in 1999, and on Pras' debut album, Ghetto Supastar, released in 1998.

Background
It enjoyed the most success in the United Kingdom, where it entered the chart at number 5, two places higher than the original its highest chart position, going on to spend six weeks on the chart. It also reached the top 10 in Finland. It charted number 18, number 23, number 50 and number 62 in New Zealand, Austria, Sweden and France, respectively. The music video for this version was directed by Michel Gondry. The song became Pras' third United Kingdom Top 10 hit from his debut solo album Ghetto Supastar, following the title track and follow-up single Blue Angels. However, Pras was not available for the filming of the video, and rapper Canibus recorded a new verse to take his place. This version was used only for the promotional video.

Track listing
 American CD single
 "Another One Bites the Dust" (Radio Edit) – 4:00
 "Another One Bites the Dust" (LP Version) – 4:20
 "Another One Bites the Dust" (Instrumental) – 4:17
 "Another One Bites the Dust" (Acappella) – 4:45

 UK CD single
 "Another One Bites the Dust" (New LP Version) – 4:20
 "Another One Bites the Dust" (Team 1 Black Rock Star Main Pass Mix) – 4:46
 "Another One Bites the Dust" (Team 1 Black Rock Star Radio Edit) – 4:17

 German CD single
 "Another One Bites the Dust" (Small Soldiers Remix) – 4:20
 "Rock and Roll (Part 2) (Dutch Remix)" (instrumental) (performed by Gary Glitter) – 3:51
 "Another One Bites the Dust" (Instrumental) – 4:17

 German CD single
 "Another One Bites the Dust" (Radio Edit) – 4:00
 "Another One Bites the Dust" (Instrumental) – 4:17

Weekly charts

Queen vs. The Miami Project

The song was remixed again in 2006. The single reached the UK Top 40, peaking at number 31, credited to Queen vs The Miami Project. The lead remix was by Cedric Gervais & Second Sun for which a new video was filmed.

Track listing
 7" picture disc vinyl
 "Another One Bites the Dust" (Cedric Gervais & Second Sun Radio Edit)
 "Another One Bites the Dust" (Original Version)

 CD single
 "Another One Bites the Dust" (Cedric Gervais & Second Sun Radio Edit)
 "Another One Bites the Dust" (Cedric Gervais & Second Sun Vocal Mix)
 "Another One Bites the Dust" (Oliver Koletski Remix)
 "Another One Bites the Dust" (A Skillz Remix)
 "Another One Bites the Dust" (Soul Avengerz Remix)
 "Another One Bites the Dust" (DJ Pedro & Oliver Berger)
 "Another One Bites the Dust" (Cedric Gervais & Second Sun Radio Edit) (video)

 Digital download EP
 "Another One Bites the Dust" (Cedric Gervais & Second Sun Radio Edit)
 "Another One Bites the Dust" (Cedric Gervais & Second Sun Vocal Mix)
 "Another One Bites the Dust" (Oliver Koletski Remix)
 "Another One Bites the Dust" (A Skillz Remix)
 "Another One Bites the Dust" (Soul Avengerz Remix)
 "Another One Bites the Dust" (DJ Pedro & Oliver Berger)

Weekly charts

Year-end charts

Certifications

Captain Jack version

In 1996, Queen Dance Traxx and German Eurodance group Captain Jack covered the song for the album Queen Dance Traxx 1 and released it as a single. The song reached number 5 in Finland and peaked at number 12 in the Netherlands. It also reached number 33 in Austria, number 41 in Belgium and number 61 in Germany. The music video for this version was directed by Rudi Dolezal and was filmed in Berlin, Germany.

Track listing
"Another One Bites the Dust" (Radio Mix) – 3:48
"Another One Bites the Dust" (Club Mix) – 5:29
Remixed by Hal & Dj Ufuk a.k.a. Helmut Apel & Ufuk Yildirim

"Another One Bites the Dust" (DJs Extended Mix) – 6:23

Weekly charts

Other versions
In 1980, "Weird Al" Yankovic recorded a parody of "Another One Bites the Dust" entitled "Another One Rides the Bus"; the narrator laments about a crowded public city bus. "Another One Rides the Bus" became so popular that Yankovic's first television appearance was a performance of the song on The Tomorrow Show (April 21, 1981) with Tom Snyder.

See also
List of Billboard Hot 100 number-one singles of 1980
List of Cash Box Top 100 number-one singles of 1980
List of number-one singles of 1980 (Canada)
List of number-one singles of 1981 (Spain)

References

External links
Lyrics from Queen official website: version from Live Magic, version from Return of the Champions
polyhex.com UK Singles Chart runs
Another One Bites the Dust – The Story Behind the Song at Wow-Vinyl

1980 songs
1980 singles
1996 singles
1998 singles
2006 singles
Billboard Hot 100 number-one singles
Cashbox number-one singles
British disco songs
DreamWorks Records singles
Elektra Records singles
EMI Records singles
Funk rock songs
Hollywood Records singles
Mute Records singles
Positiva Records singles
Number-one singles in Israel
Number-one singles in Spain
Pras songs
Queen (band) songs
RPM Top Singles number-one singles
Song recordings produced by Jerry Duplessis
Song recordings produced by Reinhold Mack
Songs written by John Deacon
Wyclef Jean songs